Daniel Jolliffe (1964–2021) was a Canadian media artist and art professor who created works of art, design and performance projects using new technologies including Global Positioning Systems (GPS).

Life and work 

Jolliffe received an MFA degree from Ohio State University and a BA in Philosophy from the University of Victoria. His interactive sculpture, One Free Minute, was performed across America and the DIY version (instructions to 'Throw Your Voice', published in Make magazine in 2005) was included in Design Life Now, the National Design Triennial curated by Ellen Lupton and exhibited at the Cooper-Hewitt National Design Museum in 2006. Jolliffe exhibited with artists including Jocelyn Robert, Thecla Schiphorst, Garnet Hertz, Ken Gregory and others and wrote about the work of Diana Burgoyne and Diane Landry.

Jolliffe's electronic machine sculptures and installations generate novelty, displaying strategic systems between humans and communities of machines. His artworks have been compared to Gordon Pask and others who have worked with computational intelligence and complex systems. The novelty generated in Jolliffe's work arises from "new relationships that are constantly formed, broken and reformed. The novelty is systemic."

Jolliffe was connected to the new media art scene internationally, exhibiting his work at Eastern Bloc (art centre) in Canada, ZKM in Germany, and attending festivals and conferences such as ISEA, WRO in Poland, and FILE Electronic Language International Festival in Brazil. His art was chosen for the WRO Media Art Biennale in Poland 2015, and in 2019 his project Control Panels was exhibited at Currents 826 on Canyon Road, Santa Fe, New Mexico.

Jolliffe died in Montreal on October 30, 2021. A file on his work can be found in the National Gallery of Canada Library and Archives - Canadian Museum of Contemporary Photography.

Nearest Costco, Monument or Satellite

Jolliffe's 2014-15 kinetic installation, Nearest Costco, Monument or Satellite, deployed networked technology to humourously explore a contemporary sense of place. The work involved a grouping of sculptures built in fourteen road cases each of which was outfitted with a telescoping mast with a pointing arrow at its terminus. Using locative technologies, when interacted with, these units point to the nearest orbiting GPS satellite, Costco store and local monument. Jolliffe described the work as a "kind of elaborate joke, but it's a serious one." The work was exhibited in Montreal, ISEA Vancouver, at the Museum of Nantes in France. The work is a type of machine performance, that produces  "choreographed poetic movment" of an array of arrows to convey both information and materiality.

Room for Walking
Jolliffe and collaborator, Thecla Shiphorst created Room for Walking in 1999 using interactive technologies that mimic human sight and speech, kinesthetics, and spatial awareness to investigate the meanings of communication. Jolliffe's part in the collaboration involved a small wagon-like vehicle that operated like a computer mouse to control a projection of a topographical satellite image. The work was described in the Regina Leader-Post newspaper as technological "new nature" where territory can be investigated through traces of the body.

Control Panels
Jolliffe's 2019 work, Control Panels dealt with the confluence of human perception and knowledge making. The installation incorporated an array of custom-built control panels fitted with dials, buttons and switches of uncertain purpose. Jolliffe states that: "Control Panels is a set of non-functional interfaces...designed to be very attractive to the viewer; you really want to touch them and turn the dials. This is the crux of the work: to show how attractive technological interfaces draw you in and make you lose track of who you are and your emotions." The work highlights absurdity within technology especially when real human emotions are part of the interface.

Shift
Jolliffe's interactive work, Shift, from 1997, deployed two small technological objects, a bowl and a small platform on wheels. Participants step onto the platform, and are able to transmit their movements through a radio system hidden within the platform, to the bowl across the room, thus controlling its movement.

Public art
Jolliffe's interactive public "speech sculpture", One Free Minute, was exhibited at La Biennale de Montréal in 2009, after being presented in 2006 at the World Urban Festival. The premise of the piece is the question, "What would you say given one free minute of anonymous public speech?" The artist found that many people carefully considered the content of their one-minute speech in a public space.

References

Further reading
Jolliffe, Daniel. Eight Missing Projects of the Maker Generation in Critical Making (handbook series), produced by Garnet Hertz.

External links 
 Official Site (archived from the original)

Canadian multimedia artists
1964 births
2021 deaths
Canadian installation artists
20th-century Canadian sculptors
21st-century Canadian sculptors
Canadian performance artists
Canadian digital artists